Drown (also titled Butterfly Stroke) is an Iranian drama crime mystery film directed by Mohammad Kart. The film screened for the first time at the 38th Fajr Film Festival and earned 12 nominations and received 5 awards.

Plot 
Parvaneh (Tanaz Tabatabai) goes to her brother-in-law Hojjat (Javad Ezzati)'s refinery garage and asks him to stop his brother Hashem (Amir Aghaei). Hashem has gone to a swimming pool with his henchmen for revenge and is destroying it because a video of Parvaneh swimming in the swimming pool is published on the Internet. On the way back from the pool, Hashem kills Parvaneh. The court sentences Hashem to death. Hojjat and his father (Nader Shahsavari) go to Parvaneh's father (Alireza Davoudnejad) for consent. Parvaneh's father says he only agrees if the one who took the video is found. Police say the SIM card that first aired the film belonged to a man named Reza Zare, who recently escaped from an addiction camp. Hojjat is looking for Reza along with Mosayeb (Mahdi Hosseininia), Hashem's close friend. But they find that Reza is dead. 

With Hashem's guidance, Hojjat goes to the people who worked with Hashem. These include Ashkan (Ali Shadman) who owns a liquor factory and Shapoor (Panthea Bahram) who runs a casino. But both deny involvement in the filming. The next day, the police arrests all the people Hojjat had approached. Their henchmen blame Hojjat for reporting them to the police and attack his house. Hojjat, along with her sister-in-law Mohammad (Iman Safa), kidnaps and harasses people in the region who have a history of snitching.

Akbar Kenti (Behrouz Panahandeh), one of the abductees, admits that it was him that reported to the police and he did so on the orders of a woman who claimed to be the temporary wife of Hojjat. Hojjat pulls the woman (Aban Asgari) to his garage by a fake accident and puts pressure on her. The woman confesses to filming Parvananeh and hiring Akbar under Mosayeb's order. 

Hojjat kidnaps Mosayeb who confesses to everything with the motive of taking revenge on Hashem and says that a few years ago Hashem hired several people to kidnap and rape Mosayeb. He also says that the arrest of Hojjat for inadvertently smuggling, followed by abortion and infertility of Afsaneh (Mahlaqa Bagheri), Hojjat's wife, was a plan of Hashem. He also says that Hojjat has inadvertently smuggled Methamphetamine for Hashem and Mosayeb several times.

Hojjat takes some money from Mosayeb to set him free. Instead, he prepares three and a half kilos of Methamphetamine (the amount which can follow a death sentence for the smuggler) and embeds it in Mosayeb's apartment and calls the police to arrest him. In the last scene of the film, Hojjat tells his family that he has not been able to find the distributor of the film.

Cast 
 Javad Ezzati as Hojat
 Amir Aghaei as Hashem
 Tannaz Tabatabaei as Parvaneh
 Ali Shadman as Ashkan
 Pantea Bahram as Shapoor
 Alireza Davood Nejad as Ahmad
 Mahlagha Bagheri as Afsaneh
 Mehdi Hosseininia as Mosayeb
 Iman Safa as Mohammad
 Hojjat Hassanpour Sargaroui as Hossein
 Nahid Moslemi as Toobi
 Aban Asgari as The Woman / Film Recorder

Reception

Awards and nominations

References

External links 
 

Iranian drama films
2020s Persian-language films
2020 drama films